The Liwiec (or Liw) is a river in Poland, and a tributary of the Bug River.

Course
The river flows in the plains of Southern Podlaskie Voivodeship and central Masovian Voivodeship. It is 142 kilometres long and drains 2763 square kilometres of watershed.

Its source is located to the north-west of Międzyrzec Podlaski near Siedlce and crosses Wyszków, Liw, Węgrów, and Stara Wieś.

Its lower estuary and confluence with the Bug River is located near the towns of Wyszków and Kamieńczyk.

It has a Natura 2000 EU Special Protection Area region.

Gallery

See also

Special Protection Areas in Poland

References

Rivers of Poland
Rivers of Masovian Voivodeship
Rivers of Podlaskie Voivodeship
Natura 2000 in Poland